Bernard Gabriel Fraser (born 21 July 1953) is a former New Zealand rugby union player. He played 124 games for Wellington, and 55 games, including 23 test matches, for New Zealand.

Personal life
Fraser was born in Lautoka; he is of Fijian descent with Scottish and Portuguese ancestry. He attended St Paul's College in Auckland. He is the father of Grammy award-winner singer and songwriter Brooke Fraser and the godfather of lawyer Greg King's eldest daughter, Pippa.

Books
 Ebony and Ivory, 1984 - with Stu Wilson

References

External links 
 

1953 births
New Zealand international rugby union players
Living people
New Zealand rugby union players
People educated at St Paul's College, Auckland
New Zealand people of I-Taukei Fijian descent
New Zealand people of Scottish descent
New Zealand people of Portuguese descent
Fijian people of I-Taukei Fijian descent
Fijian people of Scottish descent
Fijian people of Portuguese descent
Rugby union wings